Laurens ("Lau") Siebrand Mulder (7 July 1927 in Batavia, Dutch East Indies – 29 January 2006 in Uithoorn) was a Dutch field hockey player who competed in the 1952 Summer Olympics.

He was a member of the Dutch field hockey team, which won the silver medal. He played all three matches as goalkeeper.

External links
 
  Dutch Olympic Committee
profile

1927 births
2006 deaths
Dutch male field hockey players
Olympic field hockey players of the Netherlands
Field hockey players at the 1952 Summer Olympics
Olympic silver medalists for the Netherlands
Olympic medalists in field hockey
People from Batavia, Dutch East Indies
Medalists at the 1952 Summer Olympics
20th-century Dutch people